The Berzerker was the first album of the band The Berzerker. There is no human drummer on this album, as a drum machine was used.

Videos were made of the first two tracks, but neither of them were ever aired on MTV. "Forever" contains epilepsy-inducing imagery and "Reality" contains extremely grisly images taken from a medical school. The Berzerker frontman Luke says that the video for "Reality" was filmed in four days on a budget of $340.

Reception

 Allmusic  
 Kerrang   
 MMDI (Music Me Do It) 
 Metal Hammer

Track listing
"Reality" – 1:18
"Forever" – 2:41
"Burnt" – 2:53
"Pain" – 2:14
"Cannibal Rights" – 2:08
"Massacre" – 3:26
"Chronological Order of Putrefaction" – 2:48
"Deform" – 2:44
"Slit down" – 1:38
"February" – 4:07
"Mono Grind" – 1:01
"Ignorance" – 2:01
"Humanity" – 1:43
"95" – 3:52
"Ode To Nash" – 5:43

Released also as a limited 2-disc edition. Track listing for disc 2:
"Incarnated Solvent Abuse (Live)" – 4:43
"Cannibal Rights (Live)" – 2:06
"Deform (Live)" – 2:45
"Intro Commentary" – 0:57
"Isolated vocal tracks from "Massacre"" – 1:16
"Forever commentary" – 1:00
"Isolated guitar tracks from "Forever"" – 2:42
"Cannibal Rights commentary" – 0:31
"Isolated drum and sample tracks from "Cannibal Rights"" – 2:12
"February commentary" – 0:32
"Isolated vocal and keyboard tracks from "February"" – 2:02
"Burnt commentary" – 0:51
"Isolated bass tracks from "Burnt"" – 3:00
"Deform commentary" – 0:42
"Deform (Demo)" – 2:45
"Untitled (Demo)" – 1:11

Personnel
 Luke Kenny – vocals, samples, drum programming
 Ed Lacey – guitar, bass
 Jay – guitar, bass
 Sam Bean – guitar, bass, vocals
 Toby – additional vocals

References

2000 albums
The Berzerker albums
Earache Records albums